Senator Marsh may refer to:

Daniel G. Marsh (born 1937), Washington State Senate
Del Marsh (born 1956), Alabama State Senate
Gordon F. Marsh (1908–1982), Virginia State Senate
Henry L. Marsh (born 1933), Virginia State Senate
Shirley Marsh (1925–2014), Nebraska State Senate
Spencer M. Marsh (1864–1932), Wisconsin State Senate
Spencer S. Marsh (died 1875), North Carolina State Senate